Chan Yung-jan and Chuang Chia-jung were the defending champions, but chose not to participate this year.

Hsieh Su-wei and Peng Shuai won in the final, beating Daniela Hantuchová and Ai Sugiyama 7–5, 7–6(7–5).

Seeds
The top four seeds receive a bye into the second round.

Draw

Finals

Top half

Bottom half

External links
 Draw
 

Italian Open - Doubles
Women's Doubles